Hsu Li-teh (born 6 August 1931) is a Taiwanese politician. He was the Vice Premier of the Republic of China from 1993 to 1997.

Vice Premiership

Mailiao power plant groundbreaking ceremony
Speaking at the groundbreaking ceremony for the construction of Taiwan's first independent power producer power plant, the Mailiao Power Plant in Mailiao Township, Yunlin County on 12 December 1996, Hsu said that the construction of Mailiao Power Plant showed the ROC government policy to liberalize the power generation industry in Taiwan. He added that this project also served as the model for other private companies to invest in power plants.

References

1931 births
Living people
National Chengchi University alumni
Taiwanese Ministers of Economic Affairs
Taiwanese Ministers of Finance
Taiwanese people from Hubei
Republic of China politicians from Hubei
Kuomintang politicians in Taiwan